Senator Callahan may refer to:

Donald A. Callahan (1876–1951), Idaho State Senate
Sonny Callahan (born 1932), Alabama State Senate
Victor Callahan (born 1963), Missouri State Senate